(For higher educational institutions offering bachelor's, master's or doctoral degrees in forestry and related fields see: List of forestry universities and colleges.)

This is a list of notable secondary, tertiary, technical schools, and practical training institutes around the world offering one- or two-year forestry technician degrees, along with related diplomas or certificates, grouped by continent and country.

Africa

Mali 
 Forestry Practical Training Centre of Tabakoro (CFPF)

Tunisia 
 Sylvo-Pastoral Institute of Tabarka, University of Jendouba

Zambia 
 Zambia Forestry College

Americas

Bolivia
 Technical School of Forestry, Universidad Mayor de San Simón

Canada
 Forest Technology Program, Maritime College of Forest Technology, New Brunswick
 Forest Technology Program, Northern Alberta Institute of Technology (NAIT)
 Forestry Resources Technology Programme, Vancouver Island University, British Columbia

United States 
(alphabetized by state)
 Reedley College, Reedley, California
 Abraham Baldwin Agricultural College, Tifton, Georgia
 University of Maine at Fort Kent, Fort Kent, Maine
 Allegany College of Maryland, Cumberland, Maryland
 Itasca Community College, Grand Rapids, Minnesota
 Vermilion Community College, Ely, Minnesota
 Thompson School, University of New Hampshire, Durham, New Hampshire
 Paul Smith's College, Paul Smiths, New York

 SUNY-ESF Ranger School, Wanakena, New York
 SUNY Morrisville State College (a College of Agriculture and Technology), Morrisville, New York
 Haywood Community College, Clyde, North Carolina
 Montgomery Community College, Troy, North Carolina
 Southeastern Community College, Whiteville, North Carolina
 Hocking College, Nelsonville, Ohio
 Eastern Oklahoma State College, Wilburton, Oklahoma
 Central Oregon Community College, Bend, Oregon
 Mt. Hood Community College, Gresham, Oregon
 Penn State Mont Alto, Mont Alto, Pennsylvania
 Pennsylvania College of Technology, Williamsport, Pennsylvania
 Horry-Georgetown Technical College, Conway, South Carolina
 Dabney S. Lancaster Community College, Clifton Forge, Virginia
 Green River Community College, Auburn, Washington
 Spokane Community College, Spokane, Washington
 Glenville State College, Glenville, West Virginia

Asia

India
 Indira Gandhi National Forest Academy, Dehradun
 Indian Council of Forestry Research and Education, Dehradun

Europe

Austria
 Technical Forestry High School (https://www.forstschule.at/en/) HBLA Bruck an der Mur

France
 École supérieure du bois (ESB), Nantes
 Centre Forestier de la région Provence-Alpes-Côte d'Azur (https://www.centre-forestier.org/) La Bastide des Jourdans, Vaucluse

Hungary
 Kiss Ferenc Technical School of Forestry  Szeged, Hungary

Ukraine
 Carpathian Forestry College
 Lubny Forest Engineering College

United Kingdom

 Herefordshire College of Technology
 Merrist Wood College, Guildford College of Further and Higher Education
 Scotland's Rural College, Barony Campus
 Scottish School of Forestry, Inverness College
 Sparsholt College Hampshire

See also
 List of historic schools of forestry
 Lists of schools

References

External links

 Euro Forest Portal, listing of "institutions, faculties and departments that provide forestry-related higher education in Europe", European Forestry Institute
 Council of Eastern Forest Technician Schools

 Technical schools
Technical schools
 Technical schools
Forestry
Forestry
Technical schools